Wan Azizah binti Wan Ismail (Jawi: وان عزيزة بنت وان إسماعيل; born 3 December 1952) is a Malaysian politician who has served as Spouse of the Prime Minister of Malaysia Anwar Ibrahim, Member of Parliament (MP) for Bandar Tun Razak since November 2022 and 1st President of the Pakatan Harapan (PH) coalition since July 2017. She served as the 12th Deputy Prime Minister and Minister of Women, Family and Community Development in the PH administration under former Prime Minister Mahathir Mohamad from May 2018 to the collapse of the PH administration in February 2020, 1st President of the People's Justice Party (PKR) from April 1999 to November 2018, the 11th and 13th Leader of the Opposition from March 2008 to August 2008 and again from May 2015 to May 2018, MP for Pandan from May 2018 to November 2022, for Permatang Pauh from November 1999 to March 2008 and again from May 2015 to May 2018 as well as Member of the Selangor State Legislative Assembly (MLA) for Kajang from April 2014 to May 2018. She was the first female Deputy Prime Minister and Leader of the Opposition as well as the highest ever female political officeholder in the history of Malaysia. She joined politics and held a number of political offices on behalf of her husband Anwar to retain his political influence during his absence from the politics due to a series of his sodomy trials and prison sentences that had prevented him from holding the offices. She most notably served as the 1st President of PKR from the party formation to officially handing over the party leadership to Anwar after his release from prison while Anwar served as the "de facto" leader during the period.

Early life
Wan Azizah was born in 1952 at KK Women's and Children's Hospital in Singapore. She has a Peranakan grandfather and was raised Malay Muslim.

She received her early education in St. Nicholas Convent School, Alor Setar and continued her education at Tunku Kurshiah College in Seremban. She went on to study medicine at the Royal College of Surgeons in Ireland where she was awarded a gold medal in obstetrics and gynaecology and she later graduated as a qualified ophthalmologist.

Wan Azizah served as a government doctor for 14 years before deciding to focus on volunteering work, when her husband, Anwar Ibrahim was appointed the Deputy Prime Minister of Malaysia in 1993. As part of her voluntary pursuits, she became a patron of MAKNA (Majlis Kanser Nasional or National Cancer Council) in that period.

Political career

Party founder
Following the dismissal and arrest of her husband on 20 September 1998, Wan Azizah became leader of the fledgling Reformasi movement. She first led the Social Justice Movement (ADIL), a civil rights NGO, before helping to establish the Parti Keadilan Nasional on 4 April 1999. The establishment of the party saw Wan Azizah elected as the first party president, a position she was re-elected to in 2001. The position made her the second woman to lead a political party in Malaysia's history; after Ganga Nayar as the founder and first president of the Malaysian Workers' Party in 1978.

On 3 August 2003, Wan Azizah brought the party into a merger with the older Malaysian People's Party (or Parti Rakyat Malaysia) which saw the establishment of the People's Justice Party and was elected as the president of the newly merged party.

Member of Parliament
In the first elections competed by the party in 1999, Wan Azizah led the party to win five seats in the Parliament and was herself elected as the Member of Parliament for Permatang Pauh; the seat formerly held by Anwar Ibrahim; with a majority of 9,077 votes. She successfully retained the seat in the 2004 elections, after five recounts, with a reduced majority.

As a political party leader and also a parliamentary representative, Wan Azizah has spoken at UN-sponsored programs, and the local and international media. She is also the Vice-Chair of the Malaysian Parliamentary Caucus for Democracy in Myanmar and a member of the ASEAN Inter-Parliamentary Myanmar Caucus.

March 2008 general election
Wan Azizah won her parliamentary seat of Permatang Pauh in the 12th Malaysian general election with a majority of 13,388. She was supported by all the component parties of Pakatan Rakyat to lead the opposition in the lower house of parliament, House of Representatives.

With the public announcement by Anwar Ibrahim regarding his intention to return to active politics despite being legally barred from doing so, Wan Azizah indicated her readiness to vacate the position of party president if he was elected. Nonetheless, she has also indicated that she intends to defend her parliamentary seat for Permatang Pauh. She resigned her parliamentary seat for Permatang Pauh on 31 July 2008, to make way for her husband, who won the subsequent by-election on 26 August 2008 with a large majority.

2014 Kajang by-election

On 9 March 2014, PKR announced Wan Azizah as its new candidate for the Kajang by-election. This was following Anwar Ibrahim's sentencing to five years in prison after Malaysia's court of appeal overturned his sodomy acquittal, causing Anwar to be unable to run in the by-election.

On 23 March 2014, Wan Azizah was elected as the Selangor state legislative assembly member for Kajang.

2015 Permatang Pauh by-election

A by-election was held for the Dewan Rakyat seat of Permatang Pauh on 7 May 2015, after Wan Azizah's husband Anwar Ibrahim was disqualified from holding the seat after being found guilty of sodomy in a controversial trial. Wan Azizah contested the seat against three other candidates, retaining it for PKR with a majority of 8,841 votes.

2018 general election

On 7 January 2018, the opposition alliance Pakatan Harapan announced Mahathir Mohamad as their candidate for Prime Minister in the 2018 election, with Wan Azizah as Deputy. It was announced as part of a deal for Mahathir to serve as interim if elected, seeking a pardon for Anwar and making way for him to take over. Others have speculated, however, that it would be Wan Azizah who would make way for her husband.

Honours

Honours of Malaysia
Wan Azizah was honoured on the occasion of the official birthday of the Yang di-Pertua Negeri (State Governor) of Penang on 12 July 2008 when she was awarded the Darjah Panglima Pangkuan Negeri (Order of the Defender of the State), a chivalric order of the second rank in the state which carries the title Dato' Seri.
  :
  Knight Commander of the Order of the Defender of State (DPPN) - Dato' Seri (2008)

Election results

See also
 Pakatan Rakyat
 Pakatan Harapan
 Reformasi (Malaysia)

References

External links

 Asia Week: A Woman of Grace
 Result of Malaysian General Election 2008 for Permatang Pauh

|-

|-

|-

|-

|-

|-

Living people
1952 births
Anwar Ibrahim family
People from Singapore
People who lost Singaporean citizenship
Singaporean emigrants to Malaysia
Citizens of Malaysia through descent
Malaysian people of Malay descent
Peranakan people in Malaysia
Malaysian Muslims
Malaysian obstetricians
Malaysian gynaecologists
Malaysian ophthalmologists
Women ophthalmologists
Malaysian civil rights activists
Malaysian democracy activists
Malaysian political party founders
Leaders of political parties in Malaysia
People's Justice Party (Malaysia) politicians
Deputy Prime Ministers of Malaysia
Spouses of prime ministers of Malaysia
Spouses of Deputy Prime Ministers of Malaysia
Government ministers of Malaysia
Women's ministers of Malaysia
Women government ministers of Malaysia
Members of the Dewan Rakyat
Malaysian Leaders of the Opposition
Women opposition leaders
Women members of the Dewan Rakyat
Members of the Selangor State Legislative Assembly
Women MLAs in Selangor
Women in Penang politics
Alumni of the Royal College of Surgeons in Ireland
21st-century Malaysian politicians
21st-century Malaysian women politicians